Semih Yuvakuran (born 1 September 1963) is a Turkish football manager and former player. He played as a left-back for Galatasaray and Fenerbahçe in the Süper Lig.

Club career
A youth product of Bursaspor, Semih begun his career as a striker, moving to left wing, and eventually broke through professionally as a leftback in defense. Semih transferred to Galatasaray in 1984 and  helped them win two Süper Ligs, one Turkish Cup, one Chancellor Cup, two Turkish Super Cups, and one TSYD Cup. He eventually transferred to their rivals Fenerbahçe, and could not replicate their success.

Managerial career
Semih had a couple stints with lower division Turkish teams. In 2012, he managed the Turkmen club Balkan FK and helped them win the domestic double, winning the Ýokary Liga and Turkmenistan Cup.

Personal life
Semih is the father of triplet sons. All three of his sons are footballers, and one of them, Utku Yuvakuran, is a professional footballer for Beşiktaş J.K.

Honours

Player
Galatasaray
Süper Lig: 1986–1987, 1987–1988
Turkish Cup: 1984–1985
Chancellor Cup: 1985–1986
Turkish Super Cup: 1986–1987, 1987–1988
TSYD Cup: 1987–1988

Fenerbahçe
Chancellor Cup: 1992–1993
TSYD Cup: 1994–1995

Manager
Balkan FK
Ýokary Liga: 2012 Ýokary Liga
Turkmenistan Cup: 2012 Turkmenistan Cup

References

External links
 
  (as coach)
 
 Mackolik Coaching Profile

1963 births
Living people
People from Bursa
Turkish footballers
Turkey international footballers
Turkey youth international footballers
Turkish football managers
Bursaspor footballers
Galatasaray S.K. footballers
Fenerbahçe S.K. footballers
Süper Lig players
TFF First League players
Turkish expatriate football managers
Turkish expatriate sportspeople in Turkmenistan
Association football defenders
Expatriate football managers in Turkmenistan